Murray Trevor Vernon (9 February 1937 – 16 April 2013) was an Australian cricketer who played regularly for Western Australia from the late 1950s to the late 1960s. Vernon scored 4067 runs for Western Australia at an average of 34.76 with a highest score of 173, including eight centuries. He captained Western Australia in two matches in the 1962–63 season when Barry Shepherd was unavailable, losing both. Born in Kondinin and growing up in South Perth, he also captained Melville in the Western Australian Grade Cricket competition. Vernon died in Perth in April 2013, after a short illness.

References

1937 births
2013 deaths
Australian cricketers
Burials at Karrakatta Cemetery
Cricketers from Western Australia
People educated at Wesley College, Perth
People from Kondinin, Western Australia
Western Australia cricketers